The 1992 Indiana Hoosiers football team represented Indiana University Bloomington as a member of the Big Ten Conference during the 1992 NCAA Division I-A football season. Led by ninth-year head coach Bill Mallory, the Hoosiers compiled an overall record of 5–6 with a mark of 3–5 in conference play, placing in a four-way tied for sixth in the Big Ten. The team played home games at Memorial Stadium in Bloomington, Indiana.

Schedule

Roster

1993 NFL draftees

References

Indiana
Indiana Hoosiers football seasons
Indiana Hoosiers football